Lady Pank is a popular Polish rock band, started in 1981 in Wrocław by Jan Borysewicz and Andrzej Mogielnicki. One of the most popular groups in history of Polish rock.  Its first hit was Mała Lady Punk ("Little Lady Punk").

Lady Pank garnered some attention in the United States in 1985, when MTV placed the video for the band's single "Minus Zero" on rotation. The title was somewhat changed for the English language release; the original Polish title Mniej niż zero means "less than zero".

The video for one of the band's greatest hits Zawsze Tam Gdzie Ty is set on Chicago's 'L', the Quincy Station in particular.

Lineups and musicians

Jan Borysewicz and Janusz Panasewicz have been with the group since the beginning, and have maintained a specific and recognizable sound for the quintet. Most of the lead vocals are done by Panasewicz, and occasionally by Borysewicz.

The original members of band were:
Jan Borysewicz - solo guitar
Janusz Panasewicz - vocals
Paweł Mścisławski - bass guitar
Edmund Stasiak - guitar
Jarosław Szlagowski - drums

The band's current line up is:
Jan Borysewicz - solo guitar/vocals
Janusz Panasewicz - vocals
Kuba Jabłoński- drums
Krzysztof Kieliszkiewicz - bass guitar
Michał Sitarski - guitar

The band's most popular songs are: Tańcz głupia, tańcz ("Dance, stupid, dance"), Mniej niż zero ("Less than zero"), Wciąż bardziej obcy ("More and more of a stranger"), Kryzysowa narzeczona ("Crisis fiancée"), Zamki na piasku ("Castles on the sand"), Tacy sami ("Just the same"), Zostawcie Titanica ("Leave the Titanic alone"), Mała wojna ("Little war"), Zawsze tam gdzie ty ("Always there, where you are"), Znowu pada deszcz ("It's raining again"), Na granicy ("On the border"), Stacja Warszawa ("Warsaw Station").

Live performances
In 1983 alone, the group performed live 369 times. After another three years the total number of live shows grew to over 800, a record at the time in Poland. On November 30, 2000 Lady Pank played a jubilee concert in Wrocław, celebrating the group's 18th birthday. In 2007,they were celebrating their 25th birthday, during the tour promoting album "Strach się Bać".
In 2008, they started playing symphonic concerts with Orkiestra Symfoników Gdańskich. In 2012, they played several symphonic concerts, celebrating they 30th jubilee. In 2014-15 they went on an acoustic tour over Poland, recording material for the album "Akustycznie". In late 2015, they started their "The Best of" Tour.
In years 2016-2017 they played a tour, promoting their album "Miłość i władza" celebrating the 35th years on stage of the band.
In 2018, they played LP1 Tour, promoting their album "LP1". In 2021, they started a tour promoting album "LP40", celebrating their 40th birthday. The tour ended on December 17th, 2022 in Warsaw. On 22nd of June 2022 they recorded their "MTV Unplugged" concert.

Instruments
Borysewicz and the other guitar players prefer Fender Stratocaster guitars, although he also use guitars such as Gibson, Ibanez or Charvel. His favourite guitar in years 2000-2018 was Fender Stratocaster Lone Star in candy apple red colour with his daughter's hand reflected in white paint. Since 2018 he is playing a Fender Stratocaster Jeff Beck Signature models. In 2020, he released his signature model of Laboga Diamond Sound combo amp series. His sound on the first Lady Pank album is most of 1978 Fender Stratocaster, Marshall Amplification amps, BOSS CE-1 Chorus and BOSS CS-1 Compressor.

Discography

Studio albums

References

External links
 Official band's website

Polish rock music groups
Polish pop rock music groups